Alfred King may refer to:
 A. D. King (Alfred Daniel Williams King Sr., 1930–1969), American Baptist minister and civil rights activist
 Alfred John King (1859–1920), British Liberal Party politician
 Alf King (Alfred N. King, born 1941), Australian rules footballer